Benjamin Sisay (born 11 March 1956) is a Sierra Leonean boxer. He competed in the men's welterweight event at the 1980 Summer Olympics. At the 1980 Summer Olympics, he lost to Kebede Sahilu of Ethiopia.

References

External links
 

1956 births
Living people
Sierra Leonean male boxers
Olympic boxers of Sierra Leone
Boxers at the 1980 Summer Olympics
Place of birth missing (living people)
Welterweight boxers